The Le Chapelier Law was a piece of legislation passed by the National Assembly during the first phase of the French Revolution (14 June 1791), banning guilds as the early version of trade unions, as well as  (by organizations such as the Compagnons du Tour de France) and the right to strike, and proclaiming free enterprise as the norm. It was advocated and drafted by Isaac René Guy le Chapelier. Its promulgation enraged the sans-culottes, who called for an end to the National Constituent Assembly, which nonetheless continued through the second phase of the Revolution. The law was annulled on 25 May 1864, through the loi Ollivier (proposed by Émile Ollivier and acceded to by Napoleon III), which reinstated the right to associate and the right to strike.

See also
Combination Act 1799 sought to do the same in England.

External links
Translated Text
 La force de l'histoire

Further reading
Active and passive citizens

Labor history of France
1791 in law
1791 in France
Legal history of France
1791 events of the French Revolution
Guilds in France
History of labour law
Labor rights
French labour law
Trade unions in France